Souvenirs is a Danish pop duo consisting of Sofie Bonde (vocals, guitar) and her husband Nils Torp (bass, keyboards, guitar, violin, cello, accordion, vocals etc.). The group was formed in 1993 in Hjeds (now Rebild Municipality). The music for the band was written by Torp in collaboration with Johnny Voss. Souvenirs is best known for hits like "Han tog et nattog", "Jeg troede, du var hos Michael" and "Jeg hader Susanne".

Souvenirs won the Danish Music Awards in 2004 for Danish Top Album of the Year.

Discography

Albums

References

External links
Official website
Souvenirs on Discogs

Danish pop music groups
Danish musical duos